Lake Butler, which is very swampy along most of its shoreline, has a surface area of . On the northeast and east shores is a residential area. On the west is a citrus grove and on the south is grassy land with a scattering of residences.

Lake Butler has no public access on its shores. A canal connects it to Lake Eva, but the canal cannot be navigated, as it is full of swamp vegetation. There is no information about the types of fish in Lake Butler.

References

Butler
Haines City, Florida